Mari Hamada Live in Tokyo "Aestetica" is a live video by Japanese singer/songwriter Mari Hamada, released on September 7, 2011 by Meldac/Tokuma Japan on DVD. The video was recorded live on May 29, 2010 at the Nakano Sun Plaza as the final show of Hamada's Aestetica tour.

The video peaked at No. 8 on Oricon's DVD chart.

Track listing

Personnel 
 Takashi Masuzaki (Dimension) – guitar
 Yōichi Fujii – guitar
 Tomonori "You" Yamada – bass
 Satoshi "Joe" Miyawaki – drums
 Takanobu Masuda – keyboards
 Masafumi Nakao – keyboards, sound effects
 ERI (Eri Hamada) – backing vocals

Charts

References

External links 
  (Mari Hamada)
 Official website (Tokuma Japan)
 

2011 live albums
2011 video albums
Japanese-language live albums
Live video albums
Mari Hamada video albums
Tokuma Shoten albums
Albums recorded at Nakano Sun Plaza